The Eternal Feminine is a 2017 Mexican biographical film based on Mexican poet and author Rosario Castellanos.

Cast
Karina Gidi as adult Rosario Castellanos 
Tessa Ía as young Rosario Castellanos
Daniel Giménez Cacho as adult Ricardo Guerra Tejada
Pedro de Tavira as young Ricardo Guerra Tejada

References

External links 

2017 films
2010s biographical films
Mexican biographical films
2010s Spanish-language films
2010s Mexican films